The kiringi is a wooden log-drum from Sierra Leone and Guinea.
 
The instrument is formed from a piece of tree stump about 50 cm long.  This is hollowed out and closed at both ends.  Three incisions are made in the surface to create two freely-vibrating tongues, which are struck with wooden mallets.

Sources
 Curt Sachs: Kiringi. In: Real-Lexikon der Musikinstrumente. Georg Olms Verlag, Hildesheim 1972

West African musical instruments
Idiophones
African drums
Slit drums